Nazzareno Carusi (born November 9, 1968, in Celano, Abruzzo) is an Italian pianist. He studied the Piano under Lucia Passaglia, Alexis Weissenberg and Victor Merzhanov. He also studied Chamber music under Adriano Vendramelli, and received advice from Isaac Stern.

Biography
Italian conductor Riccardo Muti has described him as "a superlative pianist and an artist of the highest order".

Since his 2003 Carnegie Hall (Weill Recital) debut in New York, Carusi has been invited to perform for the world’s principal institutions, capitals and music centers, including La Scala in Milan, Teatro di San Carlo in Naples, La Fenice in Venice, Maggio Musicale Fiorentino in Florence, the Wigmore Hall in London, the Accademia Nazionale di Santa Cecilia in Rome, the Teatro Colón in Buenos Aires, the Toronto Centre for the Arts, the Palau de la Música in València, the Zipper Hall in Los Angeles, the Wallis Annenberg Center for the Performing Arts in Beverly Hills, and several times again at Carnegie Hall. He has shared the stage with dozens of top artists and orchestras including the Berlin Philharmonic, Eleonora Buratto, the Fine Arts Quartet, Mischa Maisky, Domenico Nordio and the Soloists of La Scala.

In May 2016 he was appointed Artistic Adviser of the Ferruccio Busoni International Piano Competition in Bolzano.

From 2001 to 2006 he has been Artist in residence at the Northeastern Illinois University in Chicago.

In 1990 he was one of the youngest winners of the Italian national competition to become a Faculty member in the Italian State Conservatories of Music. In 1993 he began teaching as the youngest assistant of Victor Merzhanov. Currently he teaches Chamber music in the Faculty of International Piano Academy "Incontri col Maestro" in Imola and in the Faculty of "A. Buzzolla" Conservatory of Music in Adria.

After his recital in Washington D.C. in Trio with the Soloists of La Scala, the music critic Cecelia Porter wrote on The Washington Post: "An evening of breathtaking artistry... Carusi transformed the keyboard into a 100-piece orchestra".

Recordings
 2001: Alexis Weissenberg's Masterclass in Engelberg - Gregor Antes Labor GA
 2006: Johannes Brahms: Sonatas op.120 for piano and clarinet (duo with Fabrizio Meloni) - Amadeus
 2006: Bolero - Pony Canyon - (feat. Nazzareno Carusi and I Solisti della Scala Trio)
 2007: Domenico Scarlatti - 9 Sonatas Live in Chicago - Amadeus
 2008: Notturno - EMI (feat: Sergio Cammariere, Fabrizio Bosso, Karine Levasseur)
 2009: Nazzareno Carusi Live at La Scala - EMI
 2009: Nazzareno Carusi Live at Teatro Colon - EMI
 2009: Nazzareno Carusi Live in Chicago - EMI
 2011: Petrolio - (feat. Lucio Dalla, Simona Molinari, Fabrizio Bosso, Fabrizio Meloni, Francesco Di Rosa) - Carosello Records
 2011: Camille Saint-Saëns - Sonata op.123 for cello and piano  (duo with Luigi Piovano) - Eloquentia

Awards
 2018: Carlo I d'Angiò International Award.
 2013: Justinian Award (Special Mention together with Riccardo Muti).
 2011: Lunezia Award (category: Best Classical Music Recital) for his performance "Discorso a due" together with Italian art critic Vittorio Sgarbi.
 2004: TOYP (The Outstanding Young People) Award for the Culture
 1999: Alexis-Weissenberg-Preis in Engelberg (awarded by the legendary pianist Alexis Weissenberg himself).
 1995: Winner of Animato International Piano Competition in Paris.
 1993: Winner of National Federation of Music Clubs Competition (duo with violinist Emil Chudnovsky) in Buffalo, New York
 1992: Winner of National Piano Competition in Ravenna
 1992: Winner of National Piano Competition in Albenga
 1992: Third Prize at Luis-Sigall International Piano Competition in Viña del Mar
 1991: Winner of National Piano Competition in Macerata
 1991: Winner of National Piano Competition in Rome
 1989: Winner of National Piano Competition in Moncalieri
 1982: Winner of National Piano Competition in Sulmona

Bibliography
 Paolo Isotta, La virtù dell'elefante (Marsilio Editori, Italia, 2014, pages 131-132, 262, 455, 581)
 Paolo Isotta, Altri canti di Marte (Marsilio Editori, Italia, 2015, pages 45–48, 50-55, 89, 101-102, 105-106, 130, 236, 277)
 Luca Ciammarughi, Da Benedetti Michelangeli alla Argerich. Trent'anni con i Grandi Pianisti (Zecchini Editore, Italia, 2017, page 214)
 Luca Ciammarughi, Soviet Piano. I pianisti dalla Rivoluzione d'Ottobre alla Guerra Fredda (Zecchini Editore, Italia, 2018, page 159)

Notes

External links
 Nazzareno Carusi Official Website
 The Washington Post, April 25, 2005, p. 54
 Italian Living Figures 2018
 Corriere della Sera, April 4, 2015, p.53

1968 births
Living people
People from the Province of L'Aquila
Italian classical pianists
Male classical pianists
Italian male pianists
Northeastern Illinois University faculty
21st-century classical pianists
21st-century Italian male musicians